Golden Shores is a census-designated place (CDP) in Mohave County, Arizona, United States. The population was 1,927 at the 2020 census. Residents are part of the 86436 ZIP code area, with a mailing address of Topock.

Geography
Golden Shores is located in western Mohave County at  (34.781882, −114.477747).

Demographics

As of the 2010 census, there were 2,047 people living in the CDP: 1,040 male and 1,007 female. 270 were 19 years old or younger, 139 were ages 20–34, 284 were between the ages of 35 and 49, 575 were between 50 and 64, and the remaining 779 were aged 65 and above. The median age was 59.3 years.

The racial makeup of the CDP was 94.2% White, 1.0% American Indian, 0.3% Black or African American, 0.3% Asian, 0.1% Native Hawaiian and Other Pacific Islander, 2.3% Other, and 1.7% Two or More Races. 7.7% of the population were Hispanic or Latino of any race.

There were 1,011 households in the CDP, 578 family households (57.2%) and 433 non-family households (42.8.2%), with an average household size of 3.68. Of the family households, 454 were married couples living together, with 48 single fathers and 76 single mothers, while the non-family households included 340 adults living alone: 193 male and 147 female.

The CDP contained 1,637 housing units, of which 1,011 were occupied and 626 were vacant.

Transportation
VegasAirporter is an airport shuttle service connecting Lake Havasu City and Golden Shores to McCarran International Airport in Las Vegas.

References

Census-designated places in Mohave County, Arizona